Call Her Daddy is an advice and comedy podcast created by Sofia Franklyn and Alexandra Cooper in 2018. The podcast was formerly owned and distributed by Barstool Sports until June 2021, when it was announced that Cooper had signed an exclusive deal with Spotify worth $60 million. Barstool is still involved in the podcast's merchandising. In the late spring of 2020, Cooper and Franklyn were engaged in a publicized dispute with Barstool founder David Portnoy, which resulted in Franklyn leaving the show. Cooper reached an agreement with Barstool and continued hosting the podcast on her own.

Content 
In November 2018, the Case Western Reserve student newspaper described the show as "both a new and established concept in the world of podcasts," stating:The content of the podcast is a blend of advice, whether you are in a relationship or not, hilarious stories and content from their listeners. Much of their content is not simply advice but sometimes just outright hysterical stories. Most of the advice the women lay out for their audience is about sex. The majority of the embarrassing moments detailed in their episodes talk about what some might consider taboo, but all the stories are framed in a hilarious context that makes them more approachable.

After securing an $60 million exclusivity deal with Spotify, Cooper decided to take a new direction with the podcast. Originally focusing on relationships, sex, and her own personal stories, Cooper decided to focus more on women's rights, mental health, and the importance of therapy. Via interviews with celebrities, doctors, and therapists, Cooper and her guests dive deeper into their own struggles and advice that they have been given and are now sharing to help others. Cooper hopes to inspire people and share advice to help other girls and women who are listening. She also hopes to shift into video podcasts to make her viewers have a more personable feeling when listening to her interviews.

History 
Alexandra Cooper started the podcast in 2018 with co-host and roommate Sofia Franklyn. The podcast rapidly increased in popularity, with downloads rising from 12,000 to 2 million in two months.

According to Barstool Sports founder Dave Portnoy, the company signed a three-year contract with the co-hosts in 2018. This contract provided a base salary of $75,000 that was to be supplemented with bonuses by podcast performance and a portion of merchandise sales. The contract ceded all intellectual property to Barstool Sports.

2020 break and dispute with Barstool Sports 
Following an episode titled "Kesha... The End" released April 8, 2020, new episodes stopped being released. Explanations for the break were not communicated to fans, with the co-hosts releasing a statement on Instagram noting that they "legally can't speak out yet." Amidst the lack of communication, significant gossip developed among tabloids and fan forums. On May 17, an episode was released to the podcast feed featuring Portnoy discussing the hiatus from the perspective of Barstool. The 30-minute episode described financial and contractual details. Portnoy claimed that Barstool had offered a base salary of $500,000 to the co-hosts and noted that Barstool was losing $100,000 per missed episode of the podcast. He said that Cooper had settled on new terms, but that Franklyn remained unwilling to agree to a new contract, which ultimately led to her exit from the show.

At the time, Franklyn was involved in a relationship with Peter Nelson (dubbed "Suit Man" in previous episodes of Call Her Daddy), who was working as an executive for HBO Sports. Portnoy accused Nelson of advising Franklyn to refuse Barstool's contract offer. Nelson also allegedly shopped the program around to other podcast distributors, further fraying the relationship between Franklyn and Barstool.

Return 
Alexandra Cooper began releasing the podcast alone following the break, stating in late May 2020 that she would be pushing forward without Franklyn for the future. She told listeners that a new co-host would be chosen soon. Miley Cyrus joined Cooper on the re-launched podcast in August 2020, discussing her breakup from Liam Hemsworth. Franklyn eventually began her own individual podcast titled Sofia with an F.

Acquisition by Spotify 
In June 2021, Cooper signed a deal worth $60 million to exclusively present the podcast on Spotify. However, Barstool still handles the show's merchandising.

Popularity and reception 
In 2020, Call Her Daddy was the fifth most popular podcast on Spotify. In 2021 and 2022, Call Her Daddy was ranked as the second most popular podcast on Spotify, finishing behind The Joe Rogan Experience in both years.

References

Further reading
	*

External links

2018 podcast debuts
Comedy and humor podcasts
2018 establishments in New York (state)
Advice podcasts
Audio podcasts
American podcasts